The Italian Husband is a 1697 tragedy by the English writer Edward Ravenscroft. It was first staged by Thomas Betterton's company at the Lincoln's Inn Fields Theatre in London.

The original cast included John Verbruggen as Frederico, Elizabeth Bowman as Alouisia, John Hodgson as  Alfonso, John Thurmond as Rodrigo, Marmaduke Watson as Fidalbo and John Bowman as Haynes.

References

Bibliography
 Van Lennep, W. The London Stage, 1660-1800: Volume One, 1660-1700. Southern Illinois University Press, 1960.

1697 plays
West End plays
Tragedy plays
Plays by Edward Ravenscroft